The Jurong Group Representation Constituency is a five-member Group Representation Constituency located in the western area of Singapore. The GRC consists of a large section of Jurong, sections of Bukit Batok and areas near Upper Bukit Timah Road. The five divisions of the GRC: Bukit Batok East, Jurong Central, Taman Jurong, Jurong Spring and Clementi. The current MPs are Tharman Shanmugaratnam, Tan Wu Meng, Rahayu Mahzam, Shawn Huang and Xie Yao Quan from the People's Action Party (PAP).

History 
In the 2011 general elections, the Jurong Central and Hong Kah division's population carved to form the new Jurong Spring division, while Yuhua became a SMC in return. In 2015, Bukit Batok was carved as a SMC while Clementi, a division under the West Coast GRC, was absorbed to the ward to maintain its five seats.

The constituency was first contested in the 2001 general election with the People's Action Party against the Singapore Democratic Party. The ward won a walkover in 2006 before facing another contest with the National Solidarity Party (2011), Singaporeans First (2015) and Red Dot United (2020); however, this GRC has always been held by the People's Action Party since its creation in 2001.

The ward was first led by the Minister Lim Boon Heng until his retirement from politics in 2011. After his retirement, Senior Minister Tharman Shanmugaratnam and Minister Desmond Lee Ti-Seng have assumed leadership for Jurong GRC, but Lee was transferred to West Coast GRC in 2020 together with three term MP Ang Wei Neng.

Ivan Lim was introduced on 24 June 2020 for the General Elections but withdrew 3 days later following allegations of his past behaviour. He was replaced by Xie Yao Quan.

Town Council

Jurong–Clementi Town Council is operating under the Yuhua SMC, Bukit Batok SMC & Jurong GRC.

Members of Parliament

Ong died on 14 July 2008 due to a heart failure. Following his death, Prime Minister Lee Hsien Loong announced that there would be no by-elections to fill the position since it was a GRC. His seat (Bukit Batok) was temporary replaced by Halimah Yacob from the nearby Bukit Batok East ward until the next election in 2011, where he was succeeded by David Ong.

Electoral results

Elections in 2000s

Elections in 2010s

Elections in 2020s

References

2020 General Election's result
2015 General Election's result
2011 General Election's result
2006 General Election's result
2001 General Election's result
1997 General Election's result
1991 General Election's result
1988 General Election's result

External links 
Bukit Batok Division Website
Taman Jurong Community Website
Jurong-Clementi Town Council

Singaporean electoral divisions
Bukit Batok
Bukit Timah
Jurong East
Jurong West